The Official Record Store Chart is a weekly music chart based on physical sales of albums in almost 100 independent record stores in the United Kingdom, such as Rough Trade, Rounder Records, Jumbo and Sound It Out. It is compiled by the Official Charts Company (OCC), and each week's number one is first announced on Friday evenings on the OCC's official website.

Number ones

References

Record Store 2020s
United Kingdom Record Store